Bishop Hryhoriy Komar (Anglicised as Gregory Komar; born 19 June 1976 in Letnya, Drohobych Raion, Lviv Oblast, Ukrainian SSR) is a Ukrainian Greek Catholic hierarch as the Titular Bishop of Acci and Auxiliary bishop of Sambir – Drohobych since 25 June 2014.

Life
Bishop Komar, after graduation of the school education, joined the Theological Seminary in Lviv and then continued his studies in the Pontifical Oriental Institute in Rome, Italy.

After returning in Ukraine he was ordained as deacon on 12 February 2001 and as priest on 22 April 2001, while served as teacher, prefect and subsequently (from July 2003 until June 2014) vice-rector in the Theological Seminary in Drohobych. At the same time, during 2004–2014 he served as a parish priest in the different parishes in Drohobych.

On 25 June 2014 he was confirmed by the Pope Francis as an Auxiliary Bishop of Sambir – Drohobych, Ukraine and Titular Bishop of Acci. On 22 August 2014 he was consecrated as bishop by Major Archbishop Sviatoslav Shevchuk and other hierarchs of the Ukrainian Greek Catholic Church.

References

See also

1976 births
Living people
People from Lviv Oblast
Pontifical Oriental Institute alumni
Academic staff of the Pontifical Oriental Institute
Ukrainian Eastern Catholics
Bishops of the Ukrainian Greek Catholic Church